Mecistes tarsalis is a species of leaf beetle found in the Democratic Republic of the Congo, Namibia (with uncertainty), Botswana and South Africa. It was first described by the Belgian entomologist Félicien Chapuis in 1874.

References 

Eumolpinae
Beetles of Africa
Beetles of the Democratic Republic of the Congo
Taxa named by Félicien Chapuis
Beetles described in 1874